This is a list of cities, towns, villages and hamlets on or near the Wales Coast Path, a long-distance walk which follows the coast of Wales from Chepstow to Chester. It is divided into sections corresponding to those used to market and promote the route.

Column 1 lists the settlements, column 2 shows in which administrative community the settlement is located and column 3 the principal area in which it is to be found.

South Wales Coast and Severn Estuary Coastal section
From Chepstow west to Kenfig.

Gower and Swansea Bay Coast section
From Kenfig west around Swansea Bay and the Gower Peninsula to Loughor.

Carmarthenshire Coast section
From the Loughor estuary west around Carmarthen Bay to the Pembrokeshire border near Amroth.

Pembrokeshire Coast Path section
From Amroth around the entire length of the national park to Cardigan. The inner estuary of the Cleddau is not included.

Ceredigion Coast Path section
From Cardigan north along the Cardigan Bay coast to the Dyfi Estuary but including a further short section in Powys to Machynlleth.

Llŷn Coast Path section
Llŷn Coastal Path along the Gwynedd coast of Cardigan Bay, the Llŷn Peninsula, Caernarfon Bay and the Menai Strait from Machynlleth to Bangor.

Anglesey Coast Path section
Anglesey Coastal Path clockwise around the coast of Anglesey from Menai Bridge.

North Wales Path section
North Wales Path along the Liverpool Bay coast and Dee Estuary from Bangor to Chester.

References
Names of settlements and administrative communities sourced from published Ordnance Survey 1:25,000 scale 'Explorer' map sheets

Long-distance footpaths in Wales
Coastal paths in Wales
Recreational walks in Wales
 
Coast Path